Robin Nicol Gloag (1943 – 5 December 2007) was one of the founders, with Brian Souter and Ann Gloag, of Stagecoach Group, one of the UK's largest transport businesses.

Life
On leaving school, Robin Gloag initially worked as a petrol station manager. In 1980 he and his wife, Ann, bought two old buses and established their own bus business running services from Dundee to London: Robin acted as driver and maintenance man of what became Stagecoach Group.

He ceased active involvement in the firm and sold his shareholding in Stagecoach in 1983 with the collapse of his marriage to Ann. Robin founded Highwayman Coaches of Errol, Scotland the same year.

Gloag was killed in a car crash in December 2007. The car he was driving left the road and overturned in a field near Perth. No other vehicles were involved in the accident. He was pronounced dead at the scene.

Family
Robin was married twice, first to Ann, and later to Shirley.

In 1999, Robin and Ann Gloag's son, Jonathan (aged 28), died by suicide in Perthshire. Jonathan Gloag was married at the time of his death to the former Sarah McCleary, the daughter of Ann Gloag's second husband, David McCleary.

References

External links
 Highwayman Coaches

1943 births
2007 deaths
Road incident deaths in Scotland
Stagecoach Group
British public transport executives
20th-century Scottish businesspeople